Largydonnell is a village on the R280 regional road in the north of County Leitrim in Ireland.

Transport
Bus Éireann Fridays-only route 495 (Ballyshannon-Bundoran-Kinlough-Manorhamilton) serves the village twice in each direction.

History
Nearby to Largydonnell Post Office at the hump-backed bridge, on a road to the right in Ahanlish, are the ruins of an old forge where De Cuellar, a survivor of the wreck of the Spanish Armada at Tullaghan, spent some time before proceeding to MacClancy's Castle, located on an islet in Lough Melvin in the townland of Rosclogher, where he remained for three months.

See also
 List of towns and villages in Ireland

References

Towns and villages in County Leitrim